The Jaguar R-Coupe is a concept car developed by the British car company Jaguar. It was first shown to the public at the Frankfurt Motor Show in 2001. 

Designed by Ian Callum, the four-seater, two-door coupe showed a new direction for Jaguars, which developed from the style of the 1999 Jaguar S-Type. It is the first Jaguar design fully created under Callum's direction after his appointment to the company in 1999. 

The R-Type is designed around the XKR's supercharged V8 engine and rear-drive drivetrain, but Jaguar emphasised that there were no plans for production.

External links
 R-Coupe page at the Jaguar Daimler Heritage Trust

References

R-Coupe
R-Coupe